Abram Vermont Hatch (May 14, 1893 – April 4, 1959), was a banking specialist, a member of White & Case, and general counsel of Columbia University.

Biography
He was born in 1893 to Abram Hatch and Ruth Woolley in Heber City, Utah. He graduated from Harvard University and Columbia Law School. In 1935 he built the Vermont Hatch Mansion. He died in 1959 at Columbia University.

References

1893 births
1959 deaths
20th-century American lawyers
Columbia University people
Harvard University alumni
Columbia Law School alumni